The Elyria-Lorain Broadcasting Co. (also known as Elyria-Lorain or ELB) is a privately held holding company of various assets in the broadcast media, based in Elyria, Ohio. Its parent company is the Lorain County Printing and Publishing Company, which owns the Chronicle-Telegram of Elyria and Medina County Gazette.

The company was founded in 1948 with the establishment of WEOL AM-FM in Elyria, Ohio, the AM station of which continues to serve as the company's flagship. On May 15, 1958, Elyria-Lorain Broadcasting Co. was purchased by the Lorain County Printing and Publishing Company, making it a wholly owned subsidiary. As LCP&P owned the Chronicle-Telegram (and bought the Gazette in 1962) in effect formed a radio/newspaper duopoly. This arrangement has lasted to this day, grandfathered by FCC legislation that now prohibit such arrangements.

Other stations within the chain include the Sandusky/Lake Erie Islands area cluster of WLKR FM 95.3, WLKR AM 1510, and WKFM FM 96.1.

Throughout the 1990s, Elyria-Lorain Broadcasting also owned a station in the Mansfield market, WYXZ-FM in Crestline. In 2003, WYXZ was sold off to EMF Broadcasting, which now operates the station as WYKL with their "K-Love" religious format.

The company also owned WMEL (AM 920, now WDMC) Melbourne (1956 to 1993); WROD-AM 1340 Daytona Beach (1965 to 1982) and WELE-FM 105.9 (now WOCL) DeLand - Daytona Beach - Orlando (1982 to 1986), all in Florida. WEOL-FM in Elyria became WBEA in 1965, then WCZR and WNWV in 1987, and was sold off to the Akron, Ohio-based Rubber City Radio Group, Inc. in December 2011.

Company holdings

External links
Company homepage

Mass media companies of the United States
Radio broadcasting companies of the United States
Lorain County, Ohio
Companies based in Ohio